Glenn Moi (born 27 September 1996) is a speedway rider from Norway, he is a three times Norwegian national champion.

Speedway career 
In 2016, 2017 and 2019, Moi won the Norwegian Individual Speedway Championship.

He represented Norway during the 2022 European Pairs Speedway Championship and the 2022 Speedway of Nations.

References 

Living people
1996 births
Norwegian speedway riders